Garland is a town in Penobscot County, Maine, United States.  The population was 1,026 at the 2020 census.

History 

Garland was settled in 1802 and incorporated in 1811. It was named for the first settler, Joseph Garland, who came from Salisbury, New Hampshire.

The township was originally granted by the Commonwealth of Massachusetts to Williams College, which sold it to a series of proprietors in 1798.  It was originally called "Lincoln" after one of them, Levi Lincoln.

The town had 1,247 people by 1859.

Geography 

Demographics

2010 census

As of the census of 2010, there were 1,105 people, 442 households, and 319 families living in the town. The racial makeup of the town was 97.9% White, 0.4% African American, 0.2% Native American, and 1.5% from two or more races. Hispanic or Latino of any race were 0.5% of the population.

There were 442 households, of which 28.7% had children under the age of 18 living with them, 57.0% were married couples living together, 10.2% had a female householder with no husband present, 5.0% had a male householder with no wife present, and 27.8% were non-families. 20.1% of all households were made up of individuals, and 9.3% had someone living alone who was 65 years of age or older. The average household size was 2.50 and the average family size was 2.83.

The median age in the town was 44.6 years. 22.2% of residents were under the age of 18; 6.9% were between the ages of 18 and 24; 21.5% were from 25 to 44; 35.5% were from 45 to 64; and 13.9% were 65 years of age or older. The gender makeup of the town was 51.9% male and 48.1% female.

2000 census

As of the census of 2000, there were 990 people, 379 households, and 270 families living in the town. There were 497 housing units at an average density of 13.2 per square mile (5.1/km2). The racial makeup of the town was 97.78% White, 0.20% African American, 0.51% Native American, 0.10% Asian, 0.40% Pacific Islander, and 1.01% from two or more races. Hispanic or Latino of any race were 0.40% of the population.

There were 379 households, out of which 34.8% had children under the age of 18 living with them, 59.4% were married couples living together, 6.9% had a female householder with no husband present, and 28.5% were non-families. 22.2% of all households were made up of individuals, and 8.2% had someone living alone who was 65 years of age or older.  The average household size was 2.61 and the average family size was 3.05.

In the town, the population was spread out, with 28.3% under the age of 18, 6.9% from 18 to 24, 29.5% from 25 to 44, 23.6% from 45 to 64, and 11.7% who were 65 years of age or older.  The median age was 38 years.  For every 100 females, there were 100.4 males.  For every 100 females age 18 and over, there were 100.0 males.

The median income for a household in the town was $27,500, and the median income for a family was $31,534. Males had a median income of $30,057 versus $16,959 for females. The per capita income for the town was $12,624.  About 15.1% of families and 20.0% of the population were below the poverty line, including 31.6% of those under age 18 and 13.9% of those ages 65 or older.

Notable people 

 Frederick Wintle, Maine state representative

Notable structures

 Garland Grange Hall, listed on the National Register of Historic Places

Further reading 

The definitive history of Garland, at least until 1905, is Lyndon Oak's The History of Garland, Maine, Dover, Maine: Observer Publishing Co., 1912. Reprinted 1976, Dexter Printing. (full text available at https://digitalcommons.library.umaine.edu/cgi/viewcontent.cgi?article=1194&context=mainehistory)

References

External links 

 Maine School Administrative District #46, serving Dexter, Exeter, Garland, and Ripley

Towns in Penobscot County, Maine
Towns in Maine